Carmel Magri (born 20 July 1956), who boxed under the name Charlie Magri, is a British former professional boxer. He is from a Tunisian family that settled in Mile End, London, where he grew up. During his professional career he held the WBC and lineal flyweight titles.

Early life
Born Carmel Magri in Tunis, Tunisia in 1956 to Andre and Rose Magri, both of whom were born in Tunisia and had some French-Maltese heritage via their grandparents, Magri moved with his parents and six siblings to England in 1958, and Magri was raised (after moving house a couple of times) on the Burdett Estate in East London.
Charlie Magri went to St Philip Howard RC Secondary School in Upper North Street E14.  It has been demolished and is now a housing development.

Amateur career
After playing for the Millwall F.C. youth team, which was captained by Jimmy Batten, who was already boxing regularly, Magri decided to take up boxing. As an amateur he boxed for Arbour Youth Boxing Club in Stepney Green and was trained by Jimmy Graham, who arranged for the name on Magri's ABA registration to be changed to Charlie when he was 11.

He gained the following ABA titles:
ABA Youth Champion (Class A) - 1972
ABA Youth Champion (Class B) - 1973
ABA Light-flyweight Champion (48 kg) - 1974
ABA Flyweight Champion (51 kg) - 1975
ABA Flyweight Champion (51 kg) - 1976
ABA Flyweight Champion (51 kg) - 1977

He also won a bronze medal at the 1975 European championships, and boxed for Great Britain in the 1976 Summer Olympics losing in the third round to Ian Clyde of Canada.

1976 Olympic results
Below are the results of Charlie Magri, a flyweight boxer, who competed for Great Britain at the 1976 Montreal Olympics:

 Round of 64: bye
 Round of 32: was awarded a victory by walkover versus Eric Quaotsey (Ghana)
 Round of 16: lost to Ian Clyde (Canada) by third-round knockout

Professional career
Magri was 5 ft 3 in tall and had an exciting, aggressive style, being a two-handed puncher who did not care much for defence. He was managed by Terry Lawless.

While working as a tailor's cutter by day, he had his first professional fight in October 1977, at the age of twenty-one; He knocked out Neil Mclaughlin in the second round at the Royal Albert Hall.

In only his third fight he gained the vacant British flyweight title after his fight with Dave Smith was stopped in the seventh round, equalling Dick Smith's 63-year old record for becoming British champion in the fewest fights. In December 1977 he was voted Best Young Boxer by the Boxing Writers' Club.

In his twelfth fight, in May 1979, having won the previous eleven, he won on points against Franco Udella to take the European flyweight title. He won on points over twelve rounds at Wembley Arena.

In December 1979, he defended his European title against Manuel Carrasco, of Spain, winning on points. In June 1980, he defended it again, this time against Giovanni Camputaro of Italy, winning on a technical knockout in the third.

In February 1981, he defended his European title against Spaniard, Enrique Rodríguez, knocking him out in the second round. In September he fought a re-match with Rodríguez in Avilés, Spain, and again knocked him out in the second.

World title
In March 1983, he fought Eleoncio Mercedes, of the Dominican Republic, for the WBC and lineal flyweight titles. The fight was at Wembley Arena and Magri won the titles when the fight was stopped in the seventh on cuts.

In September 1983, he defended his world titles against Frank Cedeno, of the Philippines. The fight was at Wembley Arena, and Magri lost his titles when the referee stopped the fight in the sixth, after Magri had been knocked down three times.

Later fights
In his next fight, in August 1984, Magri fought for the vacant European flyweight title that he had previously relinquished. He fought Italian Franco Cherchi in Cagliari, Italy. Magri won in the first round when a clash of heads left the Italian so badly cut that the referee had to stop the fight.

In his next fight, in February 1985, he fought for the WBC flyweight title again. Since Magri had lost it, it had changed hands several times and was now held by Sot Chitalada of Thailand. The fight was held at the Alexandra Palace, London and Chitalada won on a technical knockout at the start of the fifth, after Magri's corner retired him due to cuts.

In October 1985, Magri fought a re-match against Franco Cherchi, in Alessandria, Italy, winning by a knockout in the second round.

In May 1986, Magri had his last fight, defending his European title against Duke McKenzie of Croydon. Magri had relinquished his British flyweight title in August 1981, and McKenzie was now the holder. The fight was stopped in the fifth round when Magri was knocked down and his manager, Lawless, threw in the towel when Magri beat the count.

Professional boxing record

After boxing
Magri was the manager for super-featherweight boxer, Dean Pithie. Magri owned a sports shop on the Bethnal Green Road and later owned the Victoria pub in Bow, east London.

In 2017 he became a coach at Ealing, Hammersmith and West London College's boxing academy.

See also
List of world flyweight boxing champions
List of British world boxing champions

References

Sources
Magri, Charlie (2007) Champagne Charlie, Pennant Books,

External links

British Boxing website – Fight stats
"Champagne" Charlie Magri - CBZ Profile

 

|-

|-

1956 births
Living people
Tunisian male boxers
Sportspeople from Tunis
English male boxers
Boxers from Greater London
England Boxing champions
Flyweight boxers
Olympic boxers of Great Britain
Boxers at the 1976 Summer Olympics
British Boxing Board of Control champions
European Boxing Union champions
World flyweight boxing champions
World Boxing Council champions
The Ring (magazine) champions